Kazi Shah Mofazzal Hossain Kaikobad (born 20 February 1956) is a Bangladesh Nationalist Party (BNP) politician who served as a Jatiya Sangsad member representing the Comilla-3 constituency from 1986 to 1990 and again from 1996 to 2014.

In his political career, Kaikobad was appointed as a Whip of the Bangladesh Parliament (state minister equivalent) in 1989. Later, he was appointed as the State Minister in‐charge for the Ministry of Religious Affairs and Waqf of Bangladesh in 1990. During his parliamentary career, he has also served as a member of different parliamentary standing committees.

Kaikobad was sentenced to life imprisonment for taking part in the 2004 Dhaka grenade attack that targeted current Prime Minister Sheikh Hasina. In 2014, he was a fugitive, reportedly in Thailand. In 2016, he was made one of 33 vice-chairman in the executive committee of BNP.

Interpol had issued a red notice for Kaikobad, but cancelled it on 4 May 2018 because it was not consistent with Interpol's constitution.

References

1956 births
Living people
People from Comilla District
3rd Jatiya Sangsad members
4th Jatiya Sangsad members
6th Jatiya Sangsad members
7th Jatiya Sangsad members
8th Jatiya Sangsad members
9th Jatiya Sangsad members
Bangladeshi politicians convicted of crimes
Bangladeshi male criminals